Nicholas George Haughton (born 20 September 1994) is an English professional footballer who plays as a midfielder for  club AFC Fylde.

Career
After being released from Bolton Wanderers, Haughton joined Curzon Ashton FC. Haughton then went on to shine for Trafford FC's scholars which earned him a call up for England Schools. He subsequently began his playing career in the North West Counties League with Runcorn Town. After a trial at Middlesbrough FC, He joined Fleetwood Town in February 2014 following a trial, and was immediately loaned out to Nantwich Town of the Northern Premier League. He signed a new contract with Fleetwood in September 2014 to keep him tied to the club until 2017. He made his debut for the "Cod Army" in the Football League on 4 October 2014, coming on for Antoni Sarcevic 68 minutes into a 1–0 win over Port Vale at Highbury Stadium.

In November 2016 he went out on loan to Salford City.

In January 2018 he joined Salford City on a permanent contract on a two and a half year deal. In late October 2018 he moved to AFC Fylde.

Career statistics

Honours
AFC Fylde
FA Trophy: 2018–19

Individual
National League North Player of the Month: August/September 2021, September 2022

References

External links

1994 births
Living people
English footballers
Association football midfielders
Runcorn Town F.C. players
Fleetwood Town F.C. players
Nantwich Town F.C. players
Salford City F.C. players
Chorley F.C. players
Curzon Ashton F.C. players
Trafford F.C. players
AFC Fylde players
English Football League players
National League (English football) players
Northern Premier League players
North West Counties Football League players